Norwalk is a city in the U.S. state of Ohio and the county seat of Huron County. The population was 17,012 at the 2010 census. The city is the center of the Norwalk Micropolitan Statistical Area and part of the Cleveland–Akron–Canton Combined Statistical Area.

History

On July 11, 1779, Norwalk, Connecticut, was burned by the British Tories under Lieutenant General Tryon. A committee of the General Assembly estimated the losses to the inhabitants at $116,238.66. Later, the federal government gave an area in the Western Reserve of Ohio as compensation for those established losses.

On May 30, 1800, the United States ceded the land titles to the "fire sufferers" and the representatives of the Reserve transferred the political jurisdiction to the general government. The Indian title was extinguished by treaty on July 4, 1805, on payment of $18,916.67; and in 1806, 13 men arrived to make the first survey of the Firelands.

They passed a resolution naming many of the townships in this area known as the "Firelands of Ohio".

Between 1806 and 1810, many families made the trip to look over land they had purchased in the "Firelands". During the War of 1812, because of the fear of British and Indian raids, settlement of the Huron County area came almost to a standstill. However, in 1815, Platt Benedict of Danbury, Connecticut, visited and examined the present site of Norwalk. He returned to Danbury and purchased  of land with an eye toward establishing a town.

In July 1817, Benedict returned to Norwalk with his family and immediately built a house. This was the first permanent residence established within the limits of Norwalk Village. In May 1818, the county seat was successfully removed from Avery, Ohio, to Norwalk, and by 1819 a census showed a population of 109 residents. Platt Benedict, the founder of Norwalk and its first mayor, died in 1866 at the age of 91. He is buried in Woodlawn Cemetery.

Benedict was the first white permanent settler in Norwalk, when he came with his wife, Sarah DeForest (1777-1852) and their children Clarissa, David, Daniel, Jonas, and Eliza. His descendants remained prominent in the area. On January 19, 1936, the Sandusky Daily Register published the obituary of John L. Severance, the multi-millionaire businessman and Standard Oil founding member. In the obituary, he is listed as "a great grandson of Platt Benedict, one of the founders of [Norwalk, Ohio]".

Among the earliest settlers of Norwalk were other men of wealth and education. They brought with them not only the customs, but also the architecture of New England. Many of their homes are still standing today.

In 1881, Norwalk's population reached the required minimum to incorporate as a city, and the City of Norwalk dates from April 12, 1881.

Geography
The subregion's name recalls the founding of the area as one for settlers from cities in Connecticut that were largely destroyed by fire during the Revolutionary War. Several locations in the Firelands were named in honor of those cities, including Danbury, Greenwich, Groton, New Haven, New London, Norwalk, Norwich, and Ridgefield. Other locations were named for the settlers, including Clarksfield, Perkins, and Sherman.

The city of Norwalk is bound by Norwalk Township in each direction and a small portion of the west side is bound by Ridgefield Township.

Climate

Demographics

2010 census
As of the census of 2010, there were 17,012 people, 6,764 households, and 4,385 families living in the city. The racial makeup of the city was 92.2% White, 1.9% African American, 0.2% Native American, 0.5% Asian, 3.2% from other races, and 2.1% from two or more races. Hispanic or Latino of any race were 7.2% of the population.

There were 6,764 households, of which 34.0% had children under the age of 18 living with them, 45.1% were married couples living together, 14.8% had a female householder with no husband present, 5.0% had a male householder with no wife present, and 35.2% were non-families. 29.6% of all households were made up of individuals, and 12.2% had someone living alone who was 65 years of age or older. The average household size was 2.46 and the average family size was 3.02.

The median age in the city was 37 years. 26.2% of residents were under the age of 18; 8.5% were between the ages of 18 and 24; 25.6% were from 25 to 44; 25.2% were from 45 to 64; and 14.6% were 65 years of age or older. The gender makeup of the city was 47.8% male and 52.2% female.

2000 census
At the 2000 census, there were 16,238 people, 6,377 households and 4,234 families living in the city. The population density was 1,950.3 per square mile (752.6/km2). There were 6,687 housing units at an average density of 803.1 per square mile (309.9/km2). The racial makeup of the city was 94.53% White, 1.95% African American, 0.22% Native American, 0.32% Asian, 1.86% from other races, and 1.13% from two or more races. Hispanic or Latino of any race were 3.82% of the population.

There were 6,377 households, of which 34.7% had children under the age of 18 living with them, 49.9% were married couples living together, 12.7% had a female householder with no husband present, and 33.6% were non-families. 28.5% of all households were made up of individuals, and 11.9% had someone living alone who was 65 years of age or older. The average household size was 2.49 and the average family size was 3.06.

Age distribution was 27.9% under the age of 18, 9.1% from 18 to 24, 28.9% from 25 to 44, 19.8% from 45 to 64, and 14.2% who were 65 years of age or older. The median age was 34 years. For every 100 females, there were 91.5 males. For every 100 females age 18 and over, there were 86.1 males.

The median household income was $37,778, and the median family income was $45,789. Males had a median income of $36,582 versus $22,165 for females. The per capita income for the city was $18,519. About 6.8% of families and 8.8% of the population were below the poverty line, including 11.1% of those under age 18 and 6.0% of those age 65 or over.

Transportation

Airports
Norwalk's general aviation needs are met by Huron County Airport.

Highways

The U.S. highways that run through Norwalk include U.S. Route 20 (part of the Norwalk bypass south of town), which connects Fremont to the west and Elyria to the east; and U.S. Route 250, which connects Sandusky from the northwest and Ashland from the southeast.

State highways that run through Norwalk include State Route 13, which connects Mansfield from the south and Huron from the north; State Route 18, which connects Tiffin from the west and Medina from the east; and State Route 61, which connects Shelby from the south and Berlin Heights as well as Lake Erie from the northeast.

Furthermore, State Route 601 is an alternate two-lane highway that acts as a de facto eastern bypass of Norwalk and US 250, running from State Route 113 at Milan to State Route 18 southeast of Norwalk.

Railways
One active freight railroad line runs through Norwalk, the Wheeling and Lake Erie Railroad. Passenger rail service to New York City, Washington, DC, and Chicago is available at the Amtrak station in nearby Sandusky.

Education
Due to city annexations and previously determined school district boundaries, Norwalk is served by four public school districts. The majority of the city is served by the Norwalk City School District. Outlying portions of the city are also served by the Edison Local, Monroeville Local and Western Reserve Local School Districts.

Norwalk is also home to multiple religious schools, including Norwalk Catholic Schools / Saint Paul High School (Roman Catholic), and Trinity Christian Academy (Protestant, non-denominational).

Trivia
 The gastroenteritis-causing virus norovirus is named after the city. It was initially named the "Norwalk Agent". The virus was discovered via electron microscopy of a stool sample from the town in 1972.

Notable people
 Fred Baker, founder of Scripps Institution of Oceanography
 Alice Rufie Jordan Blake, first female law graduate at Yale
 Paul Brown, Hall of Fame American football coach
Ray Gandolf sportscaster 
 Lefty Grove, Hall of Fame baseball pitcher
 Ron Hackenberger, car collector, with 700 vehicles in Norwalk
 Frank Avery Hutchins, librarian
 Ban Johnson, first president of baseball's American League
 Vahdah Olcott-Bickford, classical guitarist
 Dennis A. Reed, member of the Wisconsin State Assembly
 Stephen M. Young, Ohio U.S. Senator and House member

References

External links

 City website
 
 
 

 
Cities in Ohio
Cities in Huron County, Ohio
Populated places established in 1817
County seats in Ohio